Oades is a surname. People with the surname include:

 J. Malcolm Oades, soil scientist
 Lindsay Oades, Australian wellbeing public policy strategist, author, researcher and academic
 Sydney A. Oades (1890–1961), British World War I flying ace